(This is a full list of films produced in Bosnia and Herzegovina. The country existed for centuries and after World War II was part of Yugoslavia for 45 years. For an A-Z list see :Category:Bosnia and Herzegovina films)

Because Bosnia and Herzegovina was part of Yugoslavia prior to its independence in 1992, all movies produced there were considered Yugoslavian movies. After the war, Bosnian cinema became one of the most awarded in the region. Some of the internationally acclaimed and multiple award-winning screenwriters, directors and producers include: Zlatko Topčić, Danis Tanović, Dino Mustafić, Ahmed Imamović, Ademir Kenović, Jasmila Žbanić, Pjer Žalica, Aida Begić.

1990s

2000s

2010s

2020s

See also
List of cinema of the world
Bosnian-Herzegovinian Film Festival
Sarajevo Film Festival

References

External links
Bosnian film at the Internet Movie Database